Haskeir Eagach is an uninhabited group of skerries, located  southwest of Haskeir in the Outer Hebrides, Scotland.

See also

 List of islands in Scotland

Notes and references

Uninhabited islands of the Outer Hebrides